Fetal bovine serum (FBS) is derived from the blood drawn from a bovine fetus via a closed system of collection at the slaughterhouse. Fetal bovine serum is the most widely used serum-supplement for the in vitro cell culture of eukaryotic cells. This is due to it having a very low level of antibodies and containing more growth factors, allowing for versatility in many different cell culture applications.

The globular protein, bovine serum albumin (BSA), is a major component of fetal bovine serum. The rich variety of proteins in fetal bovine serum maintains cultured cells in a medium in which they can survive, grow, and divide.

Because it is a biological product, FBS is not a fully defined media component, and as such varies in composition between batches. As a result of this and in an attempt to minimize the possibility of transfer of adventitious agents, serum-free and chemically defined media (CDM) have been developed. The effectiveness of serum-free media is limited, however as many cell lines still require serum in order to grow, and many serum-free media formulations can only support the growth of narrowly-defined types of cells.

Production 

FBS is a by-product of the meat industry. FBS, as with the vast majority of animal serum used in cell culture, is produced from blood collected at commercial slaughterhouses from cattle that also supply meat intended for human consumption.

The first stage of the production process for FBS is the harvesting of blood from the bovine fetus after the fetus is removed from the slaughtered cow. The blood is collected aseptically into a sterile container or blood bag and then allowed to clot. The normal method of collection is cardiac puncture, wherein a needle is inserted into the heart. This minimizes the danger of serum contamination with micro-organisms from the fetus itself, and the environment. It is then centrifuged to remove the fibrin clot and the remaining blood cells from the clear yellow (straw) colored serum. The serum is frozen prior to further processing that is necessary to make it suitable for cell culture.

The second stage of processing involves filtration, typically using a filtration chain with the final filtration being three sterile 0.1 micron membrane filters. The aseptically processed FBS is subjected to stringent quality control testing and is supplied with a detailed Certificate of Analysis. The certificate gives full test results and information concerning the origin of the serum. Certificates of Analysis vary between commercial suppliers, but each usually includes the following details: filtration statement, country of blood collection, country of manufacture, cell growth performance testing, microbial sterility testing, as well as screening for mycoplasma and virus, endotoxin, hemoglobin, IgG gamma glutamyl transferase and total protein assays.  FBS may also be tested for country of collection.

Ethics

Ethical questions have been raised regarding the blood collection process due to the potential suffering caused to the fetus. There has been discussion concerning the methodologies for the collection of fetal bovine serum. The International Serum Industry Association (ISIA) has published literature providing detail on the extensive regulation and processes employed to ensure that serum is collected in an ethical manner. Although the act of slaughter of the dam and the time which passes in the slaughter process prior to harvesting will induce unconsciousness or death of the fetus prior to serum harvesting, it has been postulated that exposure of live unborn calves to oxygen could cause them to gain awareness before being killed, resulting in active debate about the ethics of harvesting serum. While the Industry Association accepts that certain organizations have concerns, they maintain that all collections of serum take place under veterinary supervision in registered slaughterhouses controlled by the competent authority in the country of collection, making such an issue extremely unlikely.

Serum use

Fetal bovine serum is commercially available from many manufacturers, and because cells grown in vitro are highly sensitive, customers usually test specific batches to check for suitability for their specific cell type. When changing from batch to batch it is usual to adapt the cells to the new batch of material, for example, by mixing 50% of the old serum with 50% of the new serum and allowing the cells to acclimatize to the new material.

Serum is stored frozen to preserve the stability of components such as growth factors. When serum is thawed, some precipitation may be seen. This is a normal phenomenon, and it does not compromise the quality of serum in any way. The precipitate may be removed by transferring the serum to sterile tubes and centrifuging for 5 minutes at 400 × g. To limit the amount of precipitation, it is recommended that the serum is thawed in a refrigerator at 2-8˚C. The serum should be regularly stirred during this process. Repeated freeze/thaw cycles should be avoided, and it is advisable to dispense the serum into single use aliquots before freezing.

Source history 

Serum produced for use in the biotechnology industry and research sectors is highly regulated. The collection and movement of all animal derived products globally is strictly controlled. Veterinary control of animal derived products largely follows the regulations set by the EU (DG SANCO) and the US (USDA). The current regulation governing the importation of animal by-products into the EU is covered by Regulation (EU) 1069/2009 and the implementation document Regulation (EU) 142/2011.

FBS is a product collected worldwide with the main collections being centered in the United States, Australia, New Zealand, Canada, Central America, South America, and Europe.

Global sales 

Sales of FBS in 2008 were estimated to be 700,000 liters globally.

Collectors, manufacturers, and end users of FBS globally are members of the ISIA, the International Serum Industry Association. Member companies are listed on the ISIA website. Full contact details are available through this portal and the ISIA is able to answer any questions concerning the collection and use of this important resource.

The International Serum Industry Association was incorporated in June 2006 to self-regulate a previously unstandardized industry. The ISIA Mission Statement states: “ISIA shall establish, promote and assure compliance with uncompromised standards of excellence and ethics in the business practices of the global animal serum and animal derived products supply industry. Our primary focus will be on safety and safe use of serum and animal derived products through proper origin traceability, truth in labeling and appropriate standardization and oversight.”

See also 
 Human platelet lysate (HPL) as alternative to FBS
 Chemically defined medium

References

External links 
 Introduction to Fetal Bovine Serum Class
 International Serum Industry Association (ISIA)

Blood
Cattle products
Cell culture reagents